The World Customs Journal is a peer-reviewed academic journal that is published twice a year. It was launched at the World Customs Organization's second annual PICARD conference, held in Brussels on 27-28 March 2007.

The World Customs Journal covers all aspects of the roles and responsibilities of customs. Special issues have covered the topics of supply chain security and trade facilitation.

The journal is published by the Centre for and Excise Studies, Charles Sturt University, Australia, and the University of Münster, Germany, in association with the International Network of Customs Universities.

Special issues
Security: Volume 1, Number 2, September 2007
Trade Facilitation: Volume 2, Number 1, April 2008
Capacity building: Volume 2, Number 2, October 2008
The use of information and communications technology (ICT) in the cross-border environment: Volume 3, Number 1, April 2009

External links
International Network of Customs Universities
WCO PICARD Programme
World Customs Journal's Website
How To Write An Abstract For A Research Paper

Customs services
Biannual journals
Publications established in 2007
World Customs Organization